is a railway station in Mimata, Miyazaki, Japan.

Lines

Layout 
The station consists of a side platform serving a single track in a shallow cutting. There is no station building. From the access road, a flight of steps (indicated by a signboard) leads down directly to the platform where a shelter is provided. A bike shed and toilet are located on the access road opposite the station entrance.

Adjacent stations

History
Japanese National Railways (JNR) opened the station on 1 April 1965 as an additional station on the existing track of the Nippō Main Line. With the privatization of JNR on 1 April 1987, the station came under the control of JR Kyushu.

Passenger statistics
In fiscal 2016, the station was used by an average of 24 passengers (boarding only) per day.

See also
List of railway stations in Japan

References

External links
Mochibaru (JR Kyushu)

Railway stations in Miyazaki Prefecture
Railway stations in Japan opened in 1965